Kingspade is the eponymous debut album of the group Kingspade. Kingspade was a long-awaited album as it was promoted throughout albums from the group's alternate band, the Kottonmouth Kings. On the week of September 11, 2004 the album hit #11 on the Billboard Top Internet Albums chart, #44 on Top Heatseekers, and #31 on Top Independent Albums.

Singles
"Drunk in the Club"
"Spaded Jaded & Faded"
"Who's Down?"

Track listing

References

External links
Kingspade album listing
[ Billboard's official track listing]

2004 albums
Kingspade albums
Suburban Noize Records albums